Nimanburru is an extinct Western Nyulnyulan language formerly spoken on the eastern shore of the Dampier Peninsula in the north-west of Australia. Archival records exist in the Australian Institute of Aboriginal and Torres Strait Islander Studies and some of the material in Hermann Nekes and Ernest Ailred Worms' Australian Languages is from the language.

References

Nyulnyulan languages